In psychology, manipulation is defined as subterfuge designed to influence or control another, usually in a manner which facilitates one's personal aims. Definitions for the term vary in which behavior is specifically included, influenced by both culture and whether referring to the general population or used in clinical contexts. Manipulation is generally considered a dishonest form of social influence as it is used at the expense of others.

Manipulative tendencies may derive from personality disorders such as narcissistic or antisocial personality disorder. Manipulation is also correlated with higher levels of emotional intelligence, and is a chief component of the personality construct dubbed Machiavellianism.

Manipulation differs from general influence and persuasion. Non-manipulative influence is generally perceived to be harmless and it is not seen as unduly coercive to the individual's right of acceptance or rejection of influence. Also know as “ doing a Jade”. Persuasion is the ability to move others to a desired action, usually within the context of a specific goal. Persuasion often attempts to influence ones beliefs, religion, motivations, or behavior. Influence and persuasion are neither positive nor negative, unlike manipulation which is strictly negative. Manipulation is often seen as negative, though some argue that it has positive aspects. Positive manipulation is a form of practice where an individual can turn any aspect that may not be going well into a positive experience. Ultimately, one's goal is to not be manipulated but if the situation does arise, the individual is able to manifest for the best. Self-development provides the opportunity for an individual to grow, and help influence the behaviors of others as well. Individuals who behave in prosocial behavior manners can be manipulated to have positive mood reactions. Alongside showing encouragement during a time where an individual is feeling down can result in improvements in mood.

Elements of manipulation

The motivation for manipulation can be self-serving or it can be intended to help or benefit others. Antisocial manipulation is using "skills to advance personal agendas or self-serving motives at the expense of others", pro-social behavior is a voluntary act intended to help or benefit another individual or group of individuals and is an important part of empathy.

Different measures of manipulativeness focus on different aspects or expressions of manipulation, and tend to paint slightly different pictures of its predictors. Features such as low empathy, high narcissism, use of self-serving rationalisations, and an interpersonal style marked by high agency (dominance) and low communion (i.e. coldheartedness) are consistent across measures.

Manipulative behaviors typically exploit the following vulnerabilities:

Manipulation and mental illnesses 
Individuals with the following mental health issues are often prone to manipulative behavior:

 Antisocial personality disorder, 
 Borderline personality disorder,
 Conduct disorder,
 Factitious disorder,
 Histrionic personality disorder,
 Narcissistic personality disorder.

Deceitfulness and exceptional manipulative abilities are the most common traits among antisocial personality disorder and narcissistic personality disorder. It is the major feature found in the dark triad personality traits, particularly Machiavellianism.

Antisocial personality disorder or sociopathy refers to individuals who will not realize the rights and wrongs of their action and the ability to neglect others emotionally. People with this disorder may not feel that they are doing anything wrong and therefore feel free to manipulate others. This mental disorder relies on features of deceitfulness and arrogance acts. 

Borderline Personality Disorder is unique in the grouping as "borderline" manipulation is characterized as unintentional and dysfunctional manipulation. Marsha M. Linehan has stated that people with borderline personality disorder often exhibit behaviors which are not truly manipulative, but are erroneously interpreted as such. According to Linehan, these behaviors often appear as unthinking manifestations of intense pain, and are often not deliberate as to be considered truly manipulative. In the DSM-V, manipulation was removed as a defining characteristic of borderline personality disorder.

Conduct disorder is where behavioral and age appropriate actions are taken advantage of, primarily occurring in children and adolescents. Individuals with this are characterized as "lack of empathy, sense of guilt, and shallow emotion". These behaviors are shown in connection to manipulation by tying in narcissistic traits. Aggression and violence are two factors pursued by individuals with this disorder. In order for this disorder to be consistent and shown, the progression must be made for at least 12 months.

Factitious disorder is a mental illness in which individuals who purposely forge symptoms, physically or psychologically. Fabricating illnesses allows individuals to feel a thrill and receive free aid in hospital admissions and treatment. Feelings of persistence, abuse in early childhood, and excessive thoughts were common for these individuals who connected to Borderline Personality Disorder.

Histrionic personality disorder foresee individuals who seek scrutinizing behaviors, inappropriate alluring tactics, and irregular emotional patterns. Histrionic symptoms include "seeking reassurance, switching emotional, and feeling uncomfortable." Histrionic and Narcissistic Personality Disorders overlap because decisions are sporadic and unreliable. These individuals can experience these symptoms from failed attempts of depression like symptoms.

Narcissistic personality disorder is characterized as feelings of superiority, a sense of grandiosity, exhibitionism, charming but also exploitive behaviors in the interpersonal domain, success, beauty, feelings of entitlement and a lack of empathy. Those with this disorder often engage in assertive self enhancement and antagonistic self protection. All of these factors can lead an individual with narcissistic personality disorder to manipulate others.

Assessment tools

Emotional manipulation scale 
The emotional manipulation scale is a ten-item questionnaire developed in 2007 through factor analysis, primarily to measure the capability of manipulative behavior and the Machiavellianism personality trait. At the time of publication, emotional intelligence assessments did not specifically examine manipulative behavior or Machiavellianism and were instead predominantly focussed on Big Five personality trait assessment.

Managing the emotions of others scale 
The Managing the emotions of others scale (MEOS) was developed in 2013 through factor analysis to measure the ability to change emotions of others. The survey questions measure six categories: mood (or emotional state) enhancement, mood worsening, concealing emotions, capacity for inauthenticity, poor emotion skills, and using diversion to enhance mood. The enhancement, worsening and diversion categories have been used to identify the ability and willingness of manipulative behavior. The MEOS has also been used for assessing emotional intelligence, and has been compared to the HEXACO model of personality structure, for which the capacity for inauthenticity category in the MEOS was found to correspond to low honesty-humility scores on the HEXACO.

In popular psychology

Harriet B. Braiker 
Harriet B. Braiker identified the following ways that manipulators control their victims:

 Positive reinforcement: includes praise, superficial charm, superficial sympathy (crocodile tears), excessive apologizing, money, approval, gifts, attention, facial expressions such as a forced laugh or smile, and public recognition.
 Negative reinforcement: involves removing one from a negative situation as a reward.
 Gaslighting.
 Intermittent or partial reinforcement: Partial or intermittent negative reinforcement can create an effective climate of fear and doubt. Partial or intermittent positive reinforcement can encourage the victim to persist.
 Punishment: includes nagging, yelling, the silent treatment, intimidation, threats, swearing, emotional blackmail, guilt trips, sulking, crying, and playing the victim.
 Traumatic one-trial learning: using verbal abuse, explosive anger, or other intimidating behavior to establish dominance or superiority; even one incident of such behavior can condition or train victims to avoid upsetting, confronting or contradicting the manipulator.

According to Braiker, manipulators exploit the following vulnerabilities (buttons) that may exist in victims:

 the desire to please
 addiction to earning the approval and acceptance of others
 emotophobia (fear of negative emotion; i.e. a fear of expressing anger, frustration or disapproval)
 lack of assertiveness and ability to say no
 blurry sense of identity (with soft personal boundaries)
 low self-reliance
 external locus of control

Manipulators can have various possible motivations, including but not limited to:

 the need to advance their own purposes and personal gain at (virtually any) cost to others
 a strong need to attain feelings of power and superiority in relationships with others - compare megalomania (associated with, for example, narcissistic personality disorder)
 a want and need to feel in  control
 a desire to gain a feeling of power over others in order to raise their perception of self-esteem
 furtherance of cult dynamics in recruiting or retaining followers
 boredom, or growing tired of one's surroundings; seeing manipulation as a game more than hurting others
 covert agendas, criminal or otherwise, including financial manipulation (often seen when intentionally targeting the elderly or unsuspecting, unprotected wealthy for the sole purpose of obtaining victims' financial assets)
 not identifying with underlying emotions (including experiencing commitment phobia), and subsequent rationalization (offenders do not manipulate consciously, but rather try to convince themselves of the invalidity of their own emotions)
 lack of self-control over impulsive and anti-social behaviour - leading to pre-emptive or reactionary manipulation to maintain image

George K. Simon 
According to psychology author George K. Simon, successful psychological manipulation primarily involves the manipulator:

 Concealing aggressive intentions and behaviors and being affable.
 Knowing the psychological vulnerabilities of the victim to determine which tactics are likely to be the most effective.
 Having a sufficient level of ruthlessness to have no qualms about causing harm to the victim if necessary.

Techniques of manipulators may include:

Martin Kantor 
Kantor advises in his 2006 book The Psychopathology of Everyday Life: How Antisocial Personality Disorder Affects All of Us that vulnerability to psychopathic manipulators involves being too:

 Dependent – dependent people need to be loved and are therefore gullible and liable to say yes to something to which they should say no.
 Immature – has impaired judgment and so tends to believe exaggerated advertising claims.
 Naïve – cannot believe there are dishonest people in the world, or takes it for granted that if there are any, they will not be allowed to prey on others.
 Impressionable – overly seduced by charmers.
 Trusting – people who are honest often assume that everyone else is honest. They are more likely to commit themselves to people they hardly know without checking credentials, etc., and less likely to question so-called experts.
 Carelessness – not giving sufficient amount of thought or attention to harm or errors.
 Lonely – lonely people may accept any offer of human contact. A psychopathic stranger may offer human companionship for a price.
 Narcissistic – narcissists are prone to falling for unmerited flattery.
 Impulsive – make snap decisions.
 Altruistic – the opposite of psychopathic: too honest, too fair, too empathetic.
 Frugal – cannot say no to a bargain even if they know the reason it is so cheap.
 Materialistic – easy prey for loan sharks or get-rich-quick schemes.
 Greedy – the greedy and dishonest may fall prey to a psychopath who can easily entice them to act in an immoral way.
 Masochistic – lack self-respect and so unconsciously let psychopaths take advantage of them. They think they deserve it out of a sense of guilt.
 The elderly – the elderly can become fatigued and less capable of multi-tasking. When hearing a sales pitch they are less likely to consider that it could be a con. They are prone to giving money to someone with a hard-luck story. See elder abuse.

See also 

 Appeal to emotion
 Blackmail
 Brainwashing
 Bullying
 Culture of fear
 Coercion
 Coercive persuasion
 Confidence trick
 Crowd manipulation
 Covert hypnosis
 Covert interrogation
 Dark triad
 Deception
 Demagogy
 Discrediting tactic
 DISC assessment
 Dumbing down
 Fear mongering
 Gaslighting
 Half-truth
 Internet manipulation
 Isolation to facilitate abuse
 List of confidence tricks
 List of fallacies
 Lying
 Master suppression techniques
 Media manipulation
 Mind control
 Mobbing
 Psychological abuse
 Psychological warfare
 Sheeple
 Social engineering (political science)
 Social influence
 Whispering campaign

References

Further reading 

Books

 
 
 
 
 
 

Academic papers

 
  
 
 

 
Social influence
Narcissism
Psychopathy
Anti-social behaviour
Borderline personality disorder